Martin Lalor (20 December 1883 – 9 January 1957) was an Irish hurler. His championship career with the Kilkenny senior team lasted from 1897 until 1905.

Lalor made his debut on the inter-county scene as a member of the Kilkenny senior team during the 1897 championship. Over the course of the following eight seasons he won two All-Ireland medals as part of back-to-back successes in 1904 and 1905. Lalor also won five Leinster medals.

His brother, Jim Lalor, was also an All-Ireland medal winner with Kilkenny.

Honours

Threecastles
Kilkenny Senior Hurling Championship (1): 1903

Kilkenny
All-Ireland Senior Hurling Championship (2): 1904, 1905
Leinster Senior Hurling Championship (5): 1897, 1898, 1903, 1904, 1905

References

1893 births
1957 deaths
Threecastles hurlers
Kilkenny inter-county hurlers